Alastair Simpson Bell McNeil (28 January 1915 – 26 January 1944) was a Scottish international rugby union player, who was killed in World War II at Anzio after going missing in action whilst serving as a Surgeon Lieutenant.

He also played for Watsonians RFC.

McNeil played for the Scotland national cricket team as well.

See also
 List of Scottish rugby union players killed in World War II

References

Sources
 Bath, Richard (ed.) The Scotland Rugby Miscellany (Vision Sports Publishing Ltd, 2007 )
 Massie, Allan A Portrait of Scottish Rugby (Polygon, Edinburgh)

External links
 Alexander Simpson Bell McNeil's profile at Cricinfo.com
 Player profile on scrum.com

1915 births
1944 deaths
Cricketers from Edinburgh
Military personnel from Edinburgh
Royal Navy officers
Scottish rugby union players
Scotland international rugby union players
Scottish cricketers
Rugby union players from Edinburgh
Royal Navy personnel killed in World War II
Missing in action of World War II
Missing person cases in Italy
Royal Navy officers of World War II
Royal Naval Volunteer Reserve personnel of World War II